Lincoln Township is a township in Polk County, Iowa, United States.

History
Lincoln Township was established in 1870.

References

Townships in Polk County, Iowa
Townships in Iowa
1870 establishments in Iowa
Populated places established in 1870